Mynydd Gartheiniog is a mountain in southern Snowdonia, Wales. It is a long ridge running south from the cliff of Craig Portas above Dinas Mawddwy and parallel to Mynydd Dolgoed which lies to the west.

The Gartheiniog slate quarry sits on its eastern flank, and was served by the Hendre-Ddu Tramway.

It is one of the Dyfi hills.

References

Mountains and hills of Snowdonia
Landmarks in Wales
Mountains and hills of Gwynedd
Mawddwy
Dyfi Hills